Chester Hills was author of "The Builder's Guide", an architectural pattern book published in 1846, which, like those of Minard Lafever, influenced architecture in the United States.  It is a "practical treatise" on Greek and Roman style architecture.

Two buildings influenced are in Rye, New York: Lounsberry and the 1838 Peter Augustus Jay House within the Boston Post Road Historic District.,

See also
1838 Peter Augustus Jay House

References

1798 births
1854 deaths
American architecture writers
19th-century American architects